Chandannath is a municipality in Jumla District in the Karnali Province of Nepal. The municipality was established on 18 May 2014 by merging the existing Mahat Gaun, Talium, Kartik Swami (Jumla), and Chandannath village development committees (VDCs). At the time of the 1991 Nepal census it had a population of 5,842 persons living in 1,000 individual households.

Politics and Leadership 
Kantika Sejuwal of Nepali Congress is the first elected mayor of Chandannath Municipality in Karnali Province, polling 2,777 votes against 2066 by her nearest rival from CPN Maoist Center. Sejuwal is also the only woman elected mayor in the province with its 25 municipalities, apart from 54 rural municipalities.

Twin towns – sister cities 

 Kathmandu

References

External links
UN map of the municipalities of Jumla District

Populated places in Jumla District
Municipalities in Karnali Province
Nepal municipalities established in 2014